Side Effects is the third solo studio album by Canadian country rock artist Dallas Smith, released on September 2, 2016 through 604 Records. The album marks Smith's first full-length release to impact the American market. It includes the top-10 singles "Kids with Cars" and "One Little Kiss", as well as the chart-topping hits, "Autograph", "Side Effects", "Sky Stays This Blue", and "Sleepin' Around". Side Effects set a new record as the first album by a Canadian country artist to generate four number-one singles.

Background
Following the success achieved in both Canada and the US with 2014's Lifted, Smith signed an American record deal with Blaster Records in August 2015. He began working on a new album with producer Joey Moi, which would be his first full-length record to be released to both countries. The album's lead single, "Kids with Cars", was released September 11, 2016. It was the first single of his career to officially impact mainstream country radio in the US, though it failed to chart in that country.

On August 16, 2016, CMT Canada formally announced the title, cover art, release date, and track listing for Side Effects. Pre-orders for the album began on August 19, 2016 and it was officially released September 2, 2016.

Commercial performance
Side Effects debuted at number 7 on the Billboard Canadian Albums chart, with 4,000 album-equivalent units in its first week. This made the album Smith's first top ten entry and highest-charting record to date. It was also the Canadian country album with the largest first-week sales figure, according to Nielsen SoundScan and as reported by Top Country.

Side Effects sold 600 copies in the US in its debut week. The album failed to enter any American Billboard album charts, but did reach number 10 on the West North Central region-specific component chart of the Heatseekers Albums tally.

Singles
Smith set a number of records with the singles released from Side Effects, becoming the first Canadian male artist to earn four number one country singles, the first Canadian male artist to generate three number one country singles from one album ("Autograph", "Side Effects", and "Sky Stays This Blue"), and the first Canadian country artist to post three consecutive number one country singles. The album's sixth single, "Sleepin' Around", also reached number one, making Side Effects the first album to produce four chart-topping singles and tying Smith with Shania Twain as the artists with the most career number ones.

Track listing

Personnel
Adapted from the CD booklet.

Tom Bukovac - electric guitar
Dave Cohen - keyboard
Scott Cooke - mixing, recording, digital editing, bass guitar
Shannon Forrest - drums
Nick Lane - recording
Pete Lyman - mastering
Joey Moi - production, mixing, recording, electric guitar, background vocals, percussion programming
Jamie Moore - keyboard, percussion programming
Eivind Nordland - digital editing, engineering
Lloyd Aur Norman - art direction, design
Russ Pahl - pedal steel
Chad Rook - photography
Delaney Royer - cover photo, photography
Adam Schoenfeld - electric guitar
Jimmie Lee Sloas - bass guitar
Dallas Smith - lead vocals, background vocals
Bryan Sutton - acoustic guitar, banjo, bouzouki, mandolin
Ilya Toshinsky - acoustic guitar, electric guitar, banjo, mandolin
Nir Zidkyahu - drums

Charts

Album

Certifications

Notes

References

2016 albums
Dallas Smith albums
604 Records albums
Albums produced by Joey Moi
Canadian Country Music Association Album of the Year albums
Canadian Country Music Association Top Selling Canadian Album albums